Ministry of Foreign Affairs and Trade may refer to:

 Ministry of Foreign Affairs and Foreign Trade (Jamaica)
 Ministry of Foreign Affairs and Trade (New Zealand)
 Ministry of Foreign Affairs and Trade (South Korea)

See also
 Department of Foreign Affairs and Trade